Walshind is a village in the Thane district of Maharashtra, India. It is located in the Bhiwandi taluka. It lies on the Mumbai-Nashik road.

Demographics 

According to the 2011 census of India, Walshind has 230 households. The effective literacy rate (i.e. the literacy rate of population excluding children aged 6 and below) is 68.67%.

References 

Villages in Bhiwandi taluka